The Tom Fool Handicap is a Grade III American Thoroughbred horse race for four-year-olds and older at a distance of six furlongs on the dirt run annually in early March at Aqueduct Racetrack in Ozone Park, Queens, New York.  The event currently offers a purse of $200,000.

History
The race is named for U.S. Racing Hall of Fame inductee Tom Fool who was champion two-year-old of 1951 and U.S. Horse of the Year in 1953. He is one of four horses to win the New York Handicap Triple which consists of the Metropolitan Handicap, the Suburban Handicap and the Brooklyn Handicap.

The inaugural running of event was on 17 December 1975 with conditions for three-year-olds and older over a distance of seven furlongs and was won by Hobeau Farm's five-year-old Kinsman Hope who was trained by US Hall of Fame trainer H. Allen Jerkens and ridden by jockey John Ruane winning by a margin of one and one-half lengths in a time of 1:21.

The following year the event was moved and scheduled in the summer meet at Aqueduct and held in July and in 1977 the
summer meeting returned to Belmont Park.

The winner of the 1978 running, J. O. Tobin as top weight carrying 129 lbs won easily by  lengths in a very fast time of 1:20. Although this would J. O. Tobin's last victory his six wins would be enough to capture US Champion Sprint Horse for 1978.

In although the event continued with handicap conditions in 1979 the event's name was modified to the Tom Fool Stakes and was used as such until 1995.  In 1981 the American Graded Stakes Committee upgraded the classification of the event to Grade III and the following year to Grade II. 

In 1987 Groovy won the event for the second time in easily by  lengths as the 3/5 odds-on favorite. Groovy's win was his fourth straight. He would win two more events before finishind 2nd in the Breeders' Cup Sprint. His efforts won him an Eclipse Award as US Champion Sprint Horse for 1987. 

In 2002 the winner Left Bank started as the 8/5 favorite and set a new track record of 1:20.17 for the seven-furlong distance.

The 2004 running of the event only attracted four entrants. Stronach Stables' four-year-old Ghostzapper was returning after a lengthy nine-month layoff after his Grade I Vosburgh Stakes win and continued his winning streak comfortable winning the event in 1:20.42. Trainer Bobby Frankel however would pursue events that were a longer distance culminating with a victory in the Breeders' Cup Classic. Ghostzapper's outstanding season would earn him US Horse of the Year honors for 2004.

After not being held in 2010, the event was downgraded to Grade III and moved to Aqueduct in 2011 where it is held in March. From 2011 to 2017, the event was run on the inner track but is now run on the main track.

In 2015 the conditions of the event were modified not allow three-year-olds to enter.

Records

Speed record:
6 furlongs:  1:08.77 – Do Share (2019)
7 furlongs: 1:20.17 – Left Bank (2002) 

Margins: 
 lengths – Track Barron (1985)
 lengths – J. O. Tobin (1978), Groovy (1987), Do Share (2019)

Most wins:
 2 – Salutos Amigos (2015, 2016)
 2 – Calibrachoa (2011, 2012)
 2 – Rise Jim (1981, 1982)
 2 – Groovy (1986, 1987)

Most wins by a jockey:
 7 – Ángel Cordero Jr. (1976, 1981, 1982, 1985, 1987, 1988, 1991)

Most wins by a trainer:
 5 – Todd A. Pletcher (2000, 2002, 2009, 2011, 2012)
 5 – H. Allen Jerkens (1975, 1984, 1994, 1998, 2005)

Most wins by an owner:
 2 – William H. Grinold (1981, 1982)
 2 – Hobeau Farm (1975, 2005)
 2 – Shadwell Racing (1996, 2008)
 2 – Repole Stable (2011, 2012)
 2 – David Jacobson (2015, 2016)
 2 – Southern Equine Stable (2015, 2016)

Winners
{| class="wikitable sortable"
|-
! Year
! Winner
! Age
! Jockey
! Trainer
! Owner
! Distance
! Time
! Purse
! Grade
! Ref
|-style="font-size:90%; background-color:white"
|align="left" colspan=11|At Aqueduct – Tom Fool Handicap
|-style="font-size:90%"
|align=center |2023
|Little Vic
|align=center |4
|Carlos Olivero
|Juan Carlos Avila
|Victoria's Ranch
|align=center |6 furlongs
|align=center |1:09.73
|align=center |$150,000
|align=center |III
|
|-style="font-size:90%;"
|align=center |2022
|Officiating  
|align=center |4
|Manuel Franco
|Saffie Joseph Jr.
|Vegso Racing Stable
|align=center |6 furlongs
|align=center |1:12.22
|align=center |$194,000
|align=center |III
|
|-style="font-size:90%;"
|align=center |2021
|Chateau
|align=center |6
|Kendrick Carmouche
|Rob Atras
|Michael Dubb
|align=center |6 furlongs
|align=center |1:12.10
|align=center |$200,000
|align=center |III
|
|-style="font-size:90%;"
|align=center |2020
|Mind Control
|align=center |4
|Junior Alvarado
|Gregory D. Sacco
|Red Oak Stable & Madaket Stables
|align=center |6 furlongs
|align=center |1:10.88
|align=center |$213,000
|align=center |III
|
|-style="font-size:90%;"
|align=center |2019
|Do Share
|align=center |6
|Reylu Gutierrez
|Michael J. Maker
|Three Diamonds Farm
|align=center |6 furlongs
|align=center |1:08.77
|align=center |$205,200
|align=center |III
|
|-style="font-size:90%;"
|align=center |2018
|Skyler's Scramjet
|align=center |4
|Trevor McCarthy
|Michelle Nevin
|SJB Stable & Marcello Micozzi
|align=center |6 furlongs
|align=center |1:11.38
|align=center |$200,000
|align=center |III
|
|-style="font-size:90%;"
|align=center |2017
|Spartiatis
|align=center |7
|Rajiv Maragh
|Leon J. Blusiewicz
|Constantine Peter Beler
|align=center |6 furlongs
|align=center |1:11.23
|align=center |$200,000
|align=center |III
|
|-style="font-size:90%;"
|align=center |2016
|Salutos Amigos
|align=center |6
|Cornelio Velasquez
|David Jacobson
|David Jacobson & Southern Equine Stable
|align=center |6 furlongs
|align=center |1:10.17
|align=center |$200,000
|align=center |III
|
|-style="font-size:90%;"
|align=center |2015
|Salutos Amigos
|align=center |5
|Cornelio Velasquez
|David Jacobson
|David Jacobson & Southern Equine Stable
|align=center |6 furlongs
|align=center |1:09.61
|align=center |$200,000
|align=center |III
|
|-style="font-size:90%;"
|align=center |2014
|Strapping Groom
|align=center |7
|Irad Ortiz Jr.
|David Jacobson
|Drawing Away Stable & David Jacobson
|align=center |6 furlongs
|align=center |1:09.85
|align=center |$200,000
|align=center |III
|
|-style="font-size:90%;"
|align=center |2013
|Comma to the Top
|align=center |5
|Joel Rosario
|Peter L. Miller
|Gary Barber
|align=center |6 furlongs
|align=center |1:10.26
|align=center |$200,000
|align=center |III
|
|-style="font-size:90%;"
|align=center |2012
|Calibrachoa
|align=center |5
|Cornelio Velasquez
|Todd A. Pletcher
|Repole Stable
|align=center |6 furlongs
|align=center |1:09.07
|align=center |$200,000
|align=center |III
|
|-style="font-size:90%;"
|align=center |2011
|§ Calibrachoa
|align=center |4
|
|Todd A. Pletcher
|Repole Stable
|align=center |6 furlongs
|align=center |1:09.67
|align=center |$150,000
|align=center |III
|
|-style="font-size:90%; background-color:white"
|align="center" |2010
|align="center" colspan=10|Race not held
|-style="font-size:90%; background-color:white"
|align="left" colspan=11|At Belmont Park
|-style="font-size:90%;"
|align=center |2009
|Munnings
|align=center |3
|John R. Velazquez
|Todd A. Pletcher
|Derrick Smith, Mrs. John Magnier & Michael B. Tabor
|align=center |7 furlongs
|align=center |1:21.08
|align=center |$185,000
|align=center |II
|
|-style="font-size:90%;"
|align=center |2008
|
|align=center |4
|Alan Garcia
|Kiaran P. McLaughlin
|Shadwell Racing
|align=center |7 furlongs
|align=center |1:22.73
|align=center |$161,000
|align=center |II
|
|-style="font-size:90%;"
|align=center |2007
|High Finance
|align=center |4
|John R. Velazquez
|
|West Point Stable
|align=center |7 furlongs
|align=center |1:21.81
|align=center |$197,500
|align=center |II
|
|-style="font-size:90%;"
|align=center |2006
|Silver Train
|align=center |4
|Edgar S. Prado
|Richard E. Dutrow Jr.
|Four Roses Thoroughbreds
|align=center |7 furlongs
|align=center |1:21.66
|align=center |$150,000
|align=center |II
|
|-style="font-size:90%;"
|align=center |2005
|Smokume
|align=center |4
|Chantal Sutherland
|H. Allen Jerkens
|Hobeau Farm
|align=center |7 furlongs
|align=center |1:21.92
|align=center |$150,000
|align=center |II
|
|-style="font-size:90%;"
|align=center |2004
|Ghostzapper
|align=center |4
|Javier Castellano
|Robert J. Frankel
|Stronach Stables
|align=center |7 furlongs
|align=center |1:20.42
|align=center |$142,500
|align=center |II
|
|-style="font-size:90%;"
|align=center |2003
|Aldebaran
|align=center |5
|Jerry D. Bailey
|Robert J. Frankel
|Flaxman Holdings
|align=center |7 furlongs
|align=center |1:22.54
|align=center |$150,000
|align=center |II
|
|-style="font-size:90%;"
|align=center |2002
|Left Bank
|align=center |5
|John R. Velazquez
|Todd A. Pletcher
|Michael B. Tabor
|align=center |7 furlongs
|align=center |1:20.17
|align=center |$150,000
|align=center |II
|
|-style="font-size:90%;"
|align=center |2001
|Exchange Rate
|align=center |4
|Jerry D. Bailey
|D. Wayne Lukas
| Padua Stables 
|align=center |7 furlongs
|align=center |1:21.24
|align=center |$150,000
|align=center |II
|
|-style="font-size:90%;"
|align=center |2000
|Trippi
|align=center |3
|Jerry D. Bailey
|Todd A. Pletcher
|Dogwood Stable
|align=center |7 furlongs
|align=center |1:21.69
|align=center |$150,000
|align=center |II
|
|-style="font-size:90%;"
|align=center |1999
|Crafty Friend
|align=center |6
|Richard Migliore
|John C. Kimmel
|The Thoroughbred Corporation
|align=center |7 furlongs
|align=center |1:20.62
|align=center |$150,000
|align=center |II
|
|-style="font-size:90%;"
|align=center |1998
|Banker's Gold
|align=center |4
|Jorge F. Chavez
|H. Allen Jerkens
|Georgia E. Hofmann 
|align=center |7 furlongs
|align=center |1:21.04
|align=center |$150,000
|align=center |II
|
|-style="font-size:90%;"
|align=center |1997
|Diligence
|align=center |4
|Jose A. Santos
|Nicholas P. Zito
|Kinsman Stable
|align=center |7 furlongs
|align=center |1:22.40
|align=center |$150,000
|align=center |II
|
|-style="font-size:90%;"
|align=center |1996
|Kayrawan
|align=center |4
|Richard Migliore
|Kiaran P. McLaughlin
|Shadwell Racing
|align=center |7 furlongs
|align=center |1:22.95
|align=center |$108,100
|align=center |II
|
|-style="font-size:90%; background-color:white"
|align="left" colspan=11|Tom Fool Stakes
|-style="font-size:90%;"
|align=center |1995
|Lite the Fuse
|align=center |4
|Julie Krone
|Richard E. Dutrow Sr.
|Richard E. Dutrow Sr.
|align=center |7 furlongs
|align=center |1:21.72
|align=center |$108,700
|align=center |II
|
|-style="font-size:90%;"
|align=center |1994
|Virginia Rapids
|align=center |4
|Jean-Luc Samyn
|H. Allen Jerkens
|Middletown Stables
|align=center |7 furlongs
|align=center |1:22.27
|align=center |$107,300
|align=center |II
|
|-style="font-size:90%;"
|align=center |1993
|Birdonthewire
|align=center |4
|Craig Perret
|Philip M. Serpe
|Robert Kaufman
|align=center |7 furlongs
|align=center |1:20.93
|align=center |$112,800
|align=center |II
|
|-style="font-size:90%;"
|align=center |1992
|Rubiano
|align=center |5
|Julie Krone
|Flint S. Schulhofer
|Centennial Farms
|align=center |7 furlongs
|align=center |1:21.70
|align=center |$118,200
|align=center |II
|
|-style="font-size:90%;"
|align=center |1991
|Mr. Nasty
|align=center |4
|Angel Cordero Jr.
|Guadalupe Preciado
|Hidden Lane Farm
|align=center |7 furlongs
|align=center |1:21.60
|align=center |$113,000
|align=center |II
|
|-style="font-size:90%;"
|align=center |1990
|Quick Call
|align=center |6
|Jorge F. Chavez
|Sidney J. Watters Jr.
|Lynda B. Stokes
|align=center |7 furlongs
|align=center |1:21.57
|align=center |$87,800
|align=center |II
|
|-style="font-size:90%;"
|align=center |1989
|Sewickley
|align=center |4
|Randy Romero
|Flint S. Schulhofer
| Robert S. Evans 
|align=center |7 furlongs
|align=center |1:24.00
|align=center |$113,200
|align=center |II
|
|-style="font-size:90%;"
|align=center |1988
|King's Swan
|align=center |8
|Angel Cordero Jr.
|Richard E. Dutrow Sr.
|Alvin Akman
|align=center |7 furlongs
|align=center |1:22.40
|align=center |$168,300
|align=center |II
|
|-style="font-size:90%;"
|align=center |1987
|Groovy 
|align=center |4
|Angel Cordero Jr.
|Jose A. Martin
|Lone Star Stable
|align=center |7 furlongs
|align=center |1:22.40
|align=center |$114,000
|align=center |II
|
|-style="font-size:90%;"
|align=center |1986
|Groovy 
|align=center |3
|Jose A. Santos
|Jose A. Martin
|John A. Ballis
|align=center |7 furlongs
|align=center |1:21.60
|align=center |$111,600
|align=center |II
|
|-style="font-size:90%;"
|align=center |1985
|Track Barron
|align=center |4
|Angel Cordero Jr.
|LeRoy Jolley
|Peter M. Brant
|align=center |7 furlongs
|align=center |1:22.00
|align=center |$134,850
|align=center |II
|
|-style="font-size:90%;"
|align=center |1984
|Believe The Queen
|align=center |4
|Jorge Velasquez
|H. Allen Jerkens
|Bohemia Stable
|align=center |7 furlongs
|align=center |1:22.40
|align=center |$117,800
|align=center |II
|
|-style="font-size:90%;"
|align=center |1983
|
|align=center |4
|Donald MacBeth
|Reynaldo H. Nobles
|Robert E. Brennan
|align=center |7 furlongs
|align=center |1:22.20
|align=center |$86,700
|align=center |II
|
|-style="font-size:90%;"
|align=center |1982
|Rise Jim
|align=center |6
|Angel Cordero Jr.
|J. Joseph O'Shea
|William H. Grinold
|align=center |7 furlongs
|align=center |1:23.80
|align=center |$54,700
|align=center |II
|
|-style="font-size:90%;"
|align=center |1981
|Rise Jim
|align=center |5
|Angel Cordero Jr.
|J. Joseph O'Shea
|William H. Grinold
|align=center |7 furlongs
|align=center |1:21.20
|align=center |$54,700
|align=center |III
|
|-style="font-size:90%;"
|align=center |1980
|Plugged Nickle
|align=center |3
|Jeffrey Fell
|Thomas J. Kelly
|John M. Schiff
|align=center |7 furlongs
|align=center |1:22.20
|align=center |$55,100
|align=center | 
|
|-style="font-size:90%;"
|align=center |1979
|Cox's Ridge
|align=center |5
|Eddie Maple
|Joseph B. Cantey
|Loblolly Stable
|align=center |7 furlongs
|align=center |1:22.20
|align=center |$42,500
|align=center | 
|
|-style="font-size:90%; background-color:white"
|align="left" colspan=11|Tom Fool Handicap
|-style="font-size:90%;"
|align=center |1978
|J. O. Tobin
|align=center |4
|Jeffrey Fell
|Laz Barrera
| George A. Pope Jr. 
|align=center |7 furlongs
|align=center |1:20.80
|align=center |$43,250
|align=center | 
|
|-style="font-size:90%;"
|align=center |1977
|Mexican General
|align=center |4
|Craig Perret
|J. Bowes Bond
|Mrs. Albert H. Lowenthal
|align=center |7 furlongs
|align=center |1:22.00
|align=center |$37,675
|align=center | 
|
|-style="font-size:90%; background-color:white"
|align="left" colspan=11|At Aqueduct|-style="font-size:90%;"
|align=center |1976
|El Pitirre
|align=center |4
|Angel Cordero Jr.
|Laz Barrera
|Enrique Ubarri
|align=center |7 furlongs
|align=center |1:24.40
|align=center |$44,250
|align=center | 
|
|-style="font-size:90%;"
|align=center |1975
|Kinsman Hope
|align=center |5
|John Ruane
|H. Allen Jerkens
|Hobeau Farm
|align=center |7 furlongs
|align=center |1:21.40
|align=center |$44,875
|align=center |
|
|}Notes:'''

§ Ran as an entry

See also
List of American and Canadian Graded races

References

Graded stakes races in the United States
Grade 3 stakes races in the United States
Open sprint category horse races
Horse races in New York (state)
Aqueduct Racetrack
Recurring sporting events established in 1975
1975 establishments in New York (state)